Jimmy & Johnny were an American country music duo composed of Jimmy Lee Fautheree and "Country" Johnny Mathis. They scored several hits on the U.S. country charts in the 1950s.

The duo's career began on the radio show Louisiana Hayride, where both were in demand as guests. They also appeared on the Big D Jamboree. In 1951 they were signed to Capitol Records; they also recorded for Feature Records and Chess Records. Their biggest hit was 1954's "If You Don't Somebody Else Will", which reached No. 4 on the U.S. country charts.

Johnny was later replaced by Jimmy's brother, Lynn Fautheree; but the name of the duo did not change, as the producers feared a career slump. Lynn brought the group's style closer to rockabilly with songs such as "Sweet Love on My Mind," "What'cha Doin' to Me" and "Sweet Singing Daddy". They played with Faron Young's group, the Deputies, and sometimes on the Grand Ole Opry, in addition to continuing to appear regularly on Louisiana Hayride.
The song was written by Geraldine "Jerry" Hamilton. Lynn Fautheree  married Dianne Hamilton, Geraldines daughter. Lynn and Dianne left the music business soon after the birth of their daughter Lisa Fautheree  in 1959.
At the end of the 1950s, after the Fautherees moved back to Texas, Lynn exited and Mathis returned to the duo, and they recorded together until 1961. In 1995, Johnny & Jimmy reunited  for the first time since 1961, and released the gospel single "It Won't Be Much Longer".

Singles

Albums

References
[ Jimmy Lee Fautheree] at Allmusic
[ Johnny "Country" Mathis] at Allmusic
[ Review of ''If You Don't Somebody Else Will]. Allmusic.

American country music groups
D Records artists
Chess Records artists
Capitol Records artists
Decca Records artists